Barail Bhoireannach (Women's View) is a Scottish Gaelic-language talk show produced by STV. 

The programme is presented by Cathy MacDonald and modelled on ITV programme Loose Women, crossing several topical discussions on themes such as mental health, ageing and celebrities.

The series was recorded at BBC Pacific Quay by BBC Scotland.

BBC Alba shows
British television talk shows
Television series by STV Studios